The All-Ireland Senior B Hurling Championship of 1989 was the 16th staging of Ireland's secondary hurling knock-out competition.  Kildare won the championship, beating London 1-13 to 1-12 in the final at St. Conleth's Park, Newbridge.

References

 Donegan, Des, The Complete Handbook of Gaelic Games (DBA Publications Limited, 2005).

1989
B